Tate Island  is a small island on Reindeer Lake in northern Saskatchewan, Canada. The Tate Island Lodge is accessible by float plane and located on the island.

References

External links
Tate Island Lodge

Lake islands of Saskatchewan